The Ladies in the Green Hats may refer to:

 The Ladies in the Green Hats (1929 film), a French silent comedy film
 The Ladies in the Green Hats (1937 film), a French comedy drama film
 The Ladies in the Green Hats (1949 film), a French comedy film